Sniper: The White Raven is a 2022 full-length feature film from UM-Group. Work on the film began in 2019. The war drama won the 11th competition of the Ukrainian State Film Agency, and the film was awarded 23,946,572 UAH (80% of the total cost of the film's production). The film's director is Maryan Bushan. The scriptwriters are Maryan Bushan and Mykola Voronin. 

This true story (based on the life of scriptwriter Mykola Voronin) is about a pacifist hippy physics school teacher who wants to live in peace and harmony with nature, but war comes to Donbas. The main character has a keen sense of justice, and he does not want to put up with the lawlessness that an invasion wreaks, so he becomes a Ukrainian sniper.

Filming took place in the fall of 2020 at the International Center of NSU in Kyivshchyna (Kyiv Oblast). Military personnel and military equipment of the International Center and the Northern Operational Territorial Unit of the National Guard of Ukraine, as well as the Rapid Response Brigade of the National Guard of Ukraine took part in the filming. About a hundred guardsmen and about two dozen pieces of equipment took part in the mass scenes.

Plot
Based on true events, this quite raw and powerful movie follows the tragic evolution, both physical and mental, of Ukrainian Mykola Voronenko (Aldoshyn Pavlo), from a pacifist, hippy, off-the-grid, back-to-nature, eco-warrior, H.S. Physics teacher, to a vengeful elite sniper fighting for Ukraine in the 2014–2022 Donbass conflict. The change is prompted by the callous murder of his pregnant wife Nastya (Maryna Koshkina) at the hand of Russian/DPR soldiers.

The first part depicts the romantic, laid back life of Mykola and Nastya. The war and Nastya's murder change all of that. From then on, the pace is relentless. Mykola joins the Ukrainian Army and, after a short training, becomes a sniper.

The movie is pretty realistic in the depiction of the low intensity war waged by the Russian/DPR forces against Ukraine in the Donbass region (east of Ukraine), from the Spring of 2014 through February 2022. It shows the real situation on the frontline from an Ukrainian perspective. It confirms the bestial nature of war, especially that of a civil war, and how it pits neighbours against each other. Mykola eventually kills one of his students.

Cast
 Pavlo Aldoshyn - Mykola (White Raven)
  - Nastya
  — Brigade commander
 Andriy Mostrenko — Cap
  - Syeryy
  — Klim
  — Commander of the GRU 
  — Danube
 Petro Nedzelsky — Commander in the headquarters

Critical reception
On the review aggregator website Rotten Tomatoes, the film has an approval rating of 78% based on 18 professional reviews.

References

2022 films
Ukrainian-language films
War in Donbas films